Coi is a restaurant in San Francisco, California. It serves a nightly tasting menu for $250 per diner featuring seafood of the California coast. In 2017, it was awarded three Michelin stars under executive chef Matthew Kirksley.

In 2018, Erik Anderson succeeded Kirksley, who left to prepare for the 2019 Bocuse D’Or. In April 2018, San Francisco Chronicle critic Michael Bauer noted a decline under Anderson, writing, "While I can clearly see lots of talent in the kitchen, what arrives on the plate doesn’t create the excitement of a four-star kitchen."

See also
List of Michelin starred restaurants in the San Francisco Bay Area

References 

Michelin Guide starred restaurants in California
Restaurants in the San Francisco Bay Area